Colusa National Wildlife Refuge is one of six refuges in the Sacramento National Wildlife Refuge Complex located in the Sacramento Valley of north-central California. The refuge is located in Colusa County.

Geography
The  refuge primarily consists of intensively managed wetland impoundments, with some grassland and riparian habitats.

Natural history
Colusa National Wildlife Refuge typically supports wintering populations of more than 200,000 ducks and 50,000 geese.

Wetland impoundments are intensively managed to provide optimal habitat for the dense concentration of wintering waterfowl, as well as habitat for resident wildlife and spring/summer migrants.

The grassland habitat supports several populations of endangered and sensitive species of plants. The refuge is a stronghold for populations of the endangered palmate-bracted bird's beak and the threatened giant garter snake. About 35,000 visitors come to the refuge each year for wildlife viewing and 4,000 come to hunt waterfowl and pheasant.

Gallery

References

External links
Official Colusa National Wildlife Refuge website

National Wildlife Refuges in California
Wetlands of California
Grasslands of California
Protected areas of Colusa County, California
Natural history of the Central Valley (California)
Natural history of Colusa County, California
Landforms of Colusa County, California